Anita Singhvi (born 22 July 1964) is an Indian classical singer. She is an exponent of Sufi music

Early life
Anita Singhvi was born into a business family in Jodhpur, Rajasthan. She has a B.A. and LLB. She became interested in ghazal singing at the very early age of fifteen and began training under the guidance of Pandit Kshirsagar from the Gwalior gharana.

Career
Anita Singhvi made her debut with Naqsh-e-Noor album. She has performed a number of concerts both in India and abroad (Middle East, Europe, America).

Personal life
Anita Singhvi married noted lawyer and Congress party spokesperson, Abhishek Singhvi. They have two sons.

Discography
 Naqsh-e-Noor
 Shame-e-Ghazal
 Sada-e-Sufi
 Zah-e-Naseeb
 Bhakti Sufi devotion
 Tajalli

References

Living people
Indian women ghazal singers
Indian ghazal singers
1964 births
People from Jodhpur
Gwalior gharana
Singhvi family
Indian women classical singers
20th-century Indian singers
Singers from Rajasthan
20th-century Indian women singers
Women musicians from Rajasthan